Andrew Stewart, 1st Lord Avondale (died 9 September 1513) was a Scottish nobleman.

He was the son of Alexander Stewart, from whom he inherited the lands of Avondale. Alexander had inherited them from his uncle Lord Avondale, who had in turn received them following their forfeiture by the last Earl of Douglas and Avondale in 1455.

The title Lord Avondale was revived for Andrew Stewart of Avondale in about 1499. He died in 1513, killed at the Battle of Flodden. and was succeeded by his son.

Marriage and family
Lord Avondale married Margaret Kennedy, daughter of John Kennedy, 2nd Lord Kennedy, and their children included:
Andrew Stewart, 2nd Lord Avondale, who exchanged the Avondale title for Ochiltree and thus became first Lord Ochiltree. 
Henry Stewart, 1st Lord Methven, married to Margaret Tudor as her 3rd husband; her 1st was James IV of Scotland.
Sir James Stewart of Beath, father of James Stewart, 1st Lord Doune, whose son James Stewart became Earl of Moray.
Barbara Stewart, who married (1) James Sinclair of Sanday, and (2) in 1541, Roderick MacLeod of Lewis
David Stewart, married Elizabeth Elphinstone, sister of Alexander Elphinstone, 1st Lord Elphinstone

Ancestry

References

 
 Person Page

15th-century births
1513 deaths

Year of birth unknown
Deaths at the Battle of Flodden
Andrew
Lords of Parliament (pre-1707)